Dobropolski Potok is a river of Poland, a tributary of the Krzekna.

Rivers of Poland